Thousand Palms is a census-designated place (CDP) in the Coachella Valley of Riverside County, California, United States. The population was 7,715 at the 2010 census, up from 5,120 at the 2000 census.

Geography
It borders the cities of Rancho Mirage and Palm Desert.

The Coachella Valley Preserve is a 20,000-acre large nature preserve consisting of several natural desert oases, aeolian sand dunes, and California fan palm tree groves. It is home to endangered wildlife such as the Coachella Valley fringe-toed lizard and other rare endemic species to the Sonoran Desert. The oases with their springs and ponds were created as the lines of the San Andreas Fault allow for underground water to rise to the surface. It is home to 183 bird species, and also an endangered fish species, the Desert pupfish. The preserve has over 25 miles of hiking trails and has been inhabited for centuries by Native Americans. The preserve was also a popular stagecoach stop between Los Angeles the gold mines along the Colorado River.

History
Large colonies of fan palms have for long been named a thousand palms. This area was previously known as 100 Palm Spring, as seen on 1874 maps and an official Land Office map dating to 1891. The post office was established in 1915 and the area was named Edom, California after the ancient Asian nation. However, in 1919, a residents petition was carried out and the name was changed to Thousand Palms.

The location had a post office called Edom in 1913. The post office was moved in 1938 and then renamed as Thousand Palms in 1939.

Sports
 Coachella Valley Firebirds of the American Hockey League; affiliate of the Seattle Kraken of the National Hockey League.

Demographics

2010
At the 2010 census Thousand Palms had a population of 7,715. The racial makeup of Thousand Palms was 5,763 (74.7%) White, 105 (1.4%) African American, 75 (1.0%) Native American, 129 (1.7%) Asian, 10 (0.1%) Pacific Islander, 1,422 (18.4%) from other races, and 211 (2.7%) from two or more races. Hispanic or Latino of any race were 4,051 persons (52.5%).

The census reported that 7,685 people (99.6% of the population) lived in households, 30 (0.4%) lived in non-institutionalized group quarters, and no one was institutionalized.

There were 2,849 households, 817 (28.7%) had children under the age of 18 living in them, 1,431 (50.2%) were opposite-sex married couples living together, 314 (11.0%) had a female householder with no husband present, 151 (5.3%) had a male householder with no wife present.  There were 165 (5.8%) unmarried opposite-sex partnerships, and 45 (1.6%) same-sex married couples or partnerships. 727 households (25.5%) were one person and 465 (16.3%) had someone living alone who was 65 or older. The average household size was 2.70.  There were 1,896 families (66.5% of households); the average family size was 3.26.

The age distribution was 1,754 people (22.7%) under the age of 18, 636 people (8.2%) aged 18 to 24, 1,629 people (21.1%) aged 25 to 44, 1,771 people (23.0%) aged 45 to 64, and 1,925 people (25.0%) who were 65 or older.  The median age was 43.3 years. For every 100 females, there were 100.2 males.  For every 100 females age 18 and over, there were 96.5 males.

There were 3,705 housing units at an average density of 156.8 per square mile, of the occupied units 2,227 (78.2%) were owner-occupied and 622 (21.8%) were rented. The homeowner vacancy rate was 4.4%; the rental vacancy rate was 11.9%.  5,591 people (72.5% of the population) lived in owner-occupied housing units and 2,094 people (27.1%) lived in rental housing units.

2000
At the 2000 census there were 5,120 people, 1,912 households, and 1,260 families in the CDP. The racial makeup of the CDP was 74.8% White, 0.7% Black, 0.9% Native American, 0.7% Asian, 0.3% Pacific Islander, 19.4% from other races, and 3.2% from two or more races. Hispanic or Latino of any race were 43.6%.

Of the 1,912 households 28.2% had children under the age of 18 living with them, 51.7% were married couples living together, 9.3% had a female householder with no husband present, and 34.1% were non-families. 26.5% of households were one person and 17.0% were one person aged 65 or older.  The average household size was 2.7 and the average family size was 3.3.

The age distribution was 25.6% under the age of 18, 7.1% from 18 to 24, 25.1% from 25 to 44, 19.1% from 45 to 64, and 23.0% 65 or older.  The median age was 39 years. For every 100 females, there were 100.2 males.  For every 100 females age 18 and over, there were 97.8 males.

The median household income was $34,172 and the median family income  was $37,500. Males had a median income of $33,325 versus $25,543 for females. The per capita income for the CDP was $16,790.  About 9.4% of families and 12.8% of the population were below the poverty line, including 17.0% of those under age 18 and 7.1% of those age 65 or over.

Government

In the Riverside County Board of Supervisors, Thousand Palms is in 4th District, Represented by Democrat V. Manuel Perez Supervisor of the 4th District

Utilities
Electricity in Thousand Palms is served by the Imperial Irrigation District.

References

External links
 The Desert Sun, Coachella Valley Newspaper

 
Census-designated places in Riverside County, California
Coachella Valley
Populated places in the Colorado Desert